Rook End is a hamlet near the village of Widdington, in the Uttlesford district, in the county of Essex, England. Rook End contains three listed buildings, including Rook End Cottage and two small 18th-century timber-framed and plastered cottages.

References

External links 

Hamlets in Essex
Uttlesford